The Larreineta funicular is a funicular railway in the municipality of Valle de Trápaga-Trapagaran in the Basque Country, Spain. It links the downtown with the neighborhood of Larreineta.

History
The construction of the funicular was first proposed in 1912. Construction started in 1920 and after several delays, it was inaugurated in 1926. Originally, it carried both passengers and freight. In 1985, it was transferred to the Basque Government, and since 1994 it has been operated by Euskotren.

Operation
Services run every 30 minutes throughout most of the day. Tickets can be bought at the stations, or the Barik card can be used.

References

External links
 
 

Funicular railways in Spain
Rail transport in the Basque Country (autonomous community)
Euskotren
1200 mm gauge railways in Spain
1926 establishments in Spain
Railway lines opened in 1926
Mining railways
Tourist attractions in the Basque Country (autonomous community)